is a snake video game developed by Naxat Soft for the Game Boy. It was released in 1990 in North American and Japan.

Gameplay

In the future, there is a sport called Serpent. Two fighters in serpentine robotic machines try to box each other in to win the fight. The serpents are detailed in the fact that they aren't just a line, giving a greater sense of realism to the game. Each snake has a fixed number of lives; with losing a life being a representation of "losing the war." The "game over" message is a simple message saying "the bitter taste of defeat" with an animated picture of a snake crying and accompanied by a melancholic music in a waltz rhythm.

There are two modes with four difficulty levels; level 1 is considered to be the easiest (normal speed and enemy performance) while level 4 is the hardest (fast speed and enemies are likely to cheat death). The first mode allows players to simply compete against an opponent while the second mode brings in a series of small snakes that emerge when players take too long conquering a level. Missiles can be launched when the player collects them on the field. White numbers help the player develop a longer body while black numbers make the body shorter.

Missiles can either make the enemy faster (black missiles) or slower (white missiles). Winning 7 of the 13 possible matches automatically makes the player into the "champion of serpents."

References

External links
Flyer at Giant Bomb

1990 video games
Game Boy-only games
Kaga Create games
Nintendo games
Science fiction video games
Snake video games
Multiplayer and single-player video games
Game Boy games
Video games about reptiles
Video games developed in Japan
Video games scored by Atsuhiro Motoyama